The 1922 United States Senate election in Virginia was held on November 7, 1922. Incumbent Senator Claude A. Swanson was re-elected to a third term after defeating Republican J. W. McGavock. Swanson and fellow Senator Carter Glass were the first U.S. Senators to be elected by popular vote (Swanson ran unopposed in 1916) following the passage of the 17th Amendment.

Results

See also 
 United States Senate elections, 1922

References

Virginia
1922
United States Senate